Shankar Shanmugam (born 17 August 1963), credited as S. Shankar or his mononym Shankar, is an Indian filmmaker who predominantly works in Tamil cinema. He is one of the most prolific and highest paid film directors in India. His films typically deal with the contemporary social issues, vigilante themes and the usage of state of the art technology and VFX.

He made his debut as a director in the film Gentleman (1993), for which he won the Filmfare Best Director Award and the Tamil Nadu State Film Award for Best Director. He usually collaborates with composer A. R. Rahman, both having done over 11 films together. Two of his films Indian (1996) and Mudhalvan (1998), which deal with social and political issues, was commercially very successful and also submitted by India for the Academy Award for Best Foreign Language Film, but neither earned a nomination. He was awarded an honorary doctorate by M. G. R. University.

His psychological thriller Anniyan, featuring Vikram in three distinct characters (Ambi, Remo & Anniyan) was released in 2005. After Anniyan, Shankar teamed up with Rajinikanth on Sivaji (2007), the most expensive Indian film at that time.   He was paid with a record salary of 100 million for the film . It went on to become one of the highest grossing Tamil films at that time and  the highest grosser of the year. He again collaborated with Rajinikanth for a science-fiction film Enthiran (2010), which again turned out to be highest grossing Tamil film at that time and also its sequel 2.0 (2018), is the seventh highest-grossing film in India and the ninth highest-grossing Indian film worldwide.

Early life
Shankar was born on 17 August 1963 in Kumbakonam, Thanjavur district, Tamil Nadu to Muthulakshmi and Shanmugam. He completed his diploma in Mechanical Engineering from Central Polytechnic College and worked in an typewriting company before entering the film industry. He was roped into the film industry as a screenwriter by S. A. Chandrasekhar, who accidentally saw the drama stage shows made by Shankar and his team. Though he wanted to be an actor, he chose to be a director instead and became one of the leading directors in Indian Cinema.

Career

1990s
Shankar began his career as an actor in the films Vasantha Raagam in 1986 and Seetha. He later became an assistant to film directors like S. A. Chandrasekhar and Pavithran. His first break in Hindi films was as an assistant director to S. A. Chandrasekhar in Jai Shiv Shankar (1990) produced by Rajesh Khanna. His final movie with S. A. Chandrasekhar was Nanbargal.

In 1993, he made his directional debut through Gentleman. Starring Arjun Sarja in the lead role, the film was made with a higher budget in Tamil cinema during that time, won positive response and became a blockbuster. A. R. Rahman, the film's music composer continued to work with Shankar in his following 6 directorial ventures.

His second film Kadhalan, a romantic-action film was released in the following year, had Prabhu Deva in the lead role. In 1996, he collaborated with Kamal Haasan for Indian. It was dubbed in Hindi as Hindustani and Telugu as Bharateeyudu. The film was selected as the country's submission for the Academy Award for Best Foreign Language Film. Following Indian, Shankar began work on Jeans, which released in 1998 and became the most expensive film in Indian cinema at that time with a budget of  200 million. Upon release, it became one of the highest grossing Tamil films of the 1990s. He made his production debut through Mudhalvan (1999). Arjun Sarja joined the project.

2000s
Shankar opted to remake Mudhalvan in Hindi as Nayak, thus making his Bollywood debut. Nayak, released in September 2001, was declared a "Flop" by Box Office India due to the poor marketing, its high budget and distribution price. It went on to gain a cult status despite not doing well at the box office. Shankar started to work on his next film which was supposed to be a science fiction film titled Robot that was slated to have Kamal Haasan in the lead, the project was stalled since Kamal Haasan was busy with other projects. Later, the project could not move forward due to budgeting problems.

His musical entertainer film Boys was released in 2003, which received mixed response from the critics and audience, prompting it to do only average business. However A. R. Rahman's soundtrack for the film became a major sensation. On the box-office front, the Telugu dubbed version of Boys was a big hit in Andhra Pradesh. His psychological thriller Anniyan, featuring Vikram in three distinct characters (Ambi, Remo & Anniyan) was released in 2005 with Harris Jayaraj as the composer for his film. Anniyan turned out to become the second highest grossing Tamil film of 2005. Shortly after the release of Anniyan, it was reported that Shankar had teamed up with Rajinikanth and AVM Productions for a film. He renewed his association with A. R. Rahman with the film. Sivaji was made at a budget of  600 million, the most expensive Indian film at that time. He was paid with a record salary of 100 million for the film. After two years of filming, the film released in 2007. Ultimately it went on to become one of the highest grossing Tamil films of that time.

2010s
Following Sivaji, Shankar revisited the possibilities of opinion regarding the script of Robot, he later decided to make the project in Tamil with Rajinikanth and Aishwarya Rai. The film was produced by South Indian media proprietor, Kalanithi Maran, was renamed as Enthiran and was made on a budget of 1.32 billion, the most expensive Indian film. Some reports also make it one of the highest grossing Tamil films of the time. After initial reports indicating that Shankar's next film is entitled to be with Siddharth, Shankar started to work on Nanban, the Tamil remake of the 2009 Hindi film 3 Idiots starring Vijay, Jiiva and Srikanth. The film opened in January 2012. After Nanban, it was wrongly reported that Shankar's next film would be called Therdal. On 21 June 2012, Shankar announced his next film named I. A romantic thriller, Vikram essayed the roles of a bodybuilder, fashion model, and hunchback. It was his second collaboration with Shankar after Anniyan, while Amy Jackson was the female lead and his second collaboration with her, after Thaandavam. The film, made over a period of two and half years, released on 14 January 2015 to mixed reviews and earned almost 2 billion in 19 days. Then he started working on 2.0, a sequel to Enthiran, which released on 29 November 2018 and received mixed reviews. However, it went on to become the seventh highest-grossing Indian film worldwide. As of February 2021, Shankar is working on Indian 2, a sequel to Indian, with Kamal Haasan. That same month, he announced his team-up with Ram Charan and Kiara Advani under the production of Dil Raju's Sri Venkateswara Creations, thus making his debut in Telugu. Two months later, in April 2021, he announced his collaboration with Ranveer Singh. It will be produced by Jayantilal Gada under Pen Studios and is the official adaptation of his own Anniyan.

Filmography

As director, writer and producer

As an actor

Awards and nominations

National Film Awards

Filmfare Awards South

Tamil Nadu State Film Awards

Vijay Awards

Ananda Vikatan Cinema Awards

References

External links 

 
 

1963 births
Living people
Film directors from Tamil Nadu
Tamil film directors
Tamil-language film directors
Tamil screenwriters
Tamil Nadu State Film Awards winners
People from Thanjavur district
Filmfare Awards South winners
Science fiction film directors
20th-century Indian film directors
21st-century Indian film directors
Screenwriters from Tamil Nadu
20th-century Indian dramatists and playwrights
21st-century Indian dramatists and playwrights
Indian film directors